San Nicolás de los Arroyos (usually shortened to San Nicolás) is a city in the province of Buenos Aires, Argentina, on the western shore of the Paraná River,  from Rosario. It has about 133,000 inhabitants. It is the administrative seat of the partido of the same name. It is sometimes called Ciudad de María (City of Mary) due to a series of Marian apparitions that led to the erection of the Sanctuary in honor of Our Lady of the Rosary of San Nicolás that began during the 1980s and were approved by Bishop Cardelli of the diocese as "worthy of belief" in 2016.

History

San Nicolás de los Arroyos was founded on 14 April 1748 by Rafael de Aguiar, who gave it its name to honour Saint Nicholas of Bari, now patron of the city.

The closeness to the border between Buenos Aires and two other large provinces made the city a natural stage for the struggle between federalist and Unitarians forces in mid-19th century. The agreement between thirteen provinces on 31 May 1852, which ratified the Federal Pact and called for a Constitutional Assembly sponsored by Justo José de Urquiza, was signed in this town, and became known as Acuerdo de San Nicolás de los Arroyos.

Geography

The city is located in the north-east of the province of Buenos Aires, 240 km from Buenos Aires City, within the so-called Industrial Corridor that goes from Greater Rosario to La Plata. Its limits are: to the west, Pergamino; to the south, Ramallo; to the east, with the Paraná River, which separates it from the province of Entre Ríos; and to the north, with the Arroyo del Medio, a small river that separates it from the province of Santa Fe.

Its main accesses are in the north–south axis: the Rosario-Buenos Aires Highway, and the Nuevo Central Argentino railroad.

San Nicolás has an important port on the Paraná, able to service large cargo ships. The railway system has passenger and cargo stations, the latter reaching up to the port.

Education

The city has 43 kindergarten institutions, 58 schools of Elementary Education, 28 of High-school level (both public and private), 26 schools for adults and a large number of tertiary studies institutes.
It is also home of the San Nicolás Regional Faculty, a branch of the National Technological University (UTN)

Cultural life

There are a variety cultural institutions in the city, though the most important one is perhaps the Rafael de Aguiar Municipal Theatre, founded on August 10, 1908, and designed as a smaller model of the Teatro Colón in Buenos Aires.

Among the many libraries in the city, the oldest and largest is the Rafael de Aguiar Popular Library, founded in 1947 by Juana Couretot de Guella.

City sights

Notable natives

Footballer Gustavo Pedro Echaniz
Health Minister Ginés González García 
Journalist and short story writer Manuel Peyrou (1902–1974) 
Revolutionary and guerrilla leader Enrique Gorriarán Merlo (1942–2006)
Members of the folk music band Los Arroyeños 
Designer and App Developer Andres Buzzio
Football legend Omar Sivori
Former football players Héctor Baley, Leo Franco, Patricio Hernández, Rubén Pagnanini, Andrés Guglielminpietro, Nelson Vivas and Bruno Marioni

Notes and references
 This article draws material from the corresponding article in the Spanish Wikipedia.

External links

 
 Ministry of Education - Acuerdo de San Nicolás.
 Municipality of San Nicolás de los Arroyos - Official website.
 The Portal of the city
 Tourism Official Site
 Diario El Norte - Local newspaper
 Biblioteca Popular "Rafael de Aguiar" - Public Library

Populated places in Buenos Aires Province
Paraná River
Port settlements in Argentina
Populated places established in 1748
Cities in Argentina
San Nicolás Partido
Argentina